William Franklin Avery Jr. (born August 8, 1979) is an American former professional basketball player.

College career

Avery, at 6 ft 2 in (1.90 m), was the starting point guard on the 1998–99 Duke Blue Devils men's basketball team, where he averaged 14.9 points and 5.0 assists per game his sophomore year. After winning 32 straight games, Duke lost in the National Championship game to the University of Connecticut. Avery, along with Elton Brand and Corey Maggette, became one of the first players under Mike Krzyzewski to leave Duke before graduating.

Professional career

NBA

Avery was selected 14th overall by the Minnesota Timberwolves in the 1999 NBA Draft after his sophomore year. He averaged 2.7 points per game and 1.4 assists per game in 142 NBA games over three seasons with the Timberwolves.

Israel and Europe

Avery was not signed by any NBA teams after his 3-year contract with the Timberwolves expired in 2002, so he moved his career overseas. Avery played with the following pro clubs: Hapoel Tel Aviv and Hapoel Jerusalem of the Israeli League, Strasbourg IG of the French League, Azovmash Mariupol of the Ukrainian League, Makedonikos Alfa, Panionios, and AEK Athens of the Greek League, ALBA Berlin of the German League, and Galatasaray Café Crown of the Turkish League.

Avery was released from Galatasaray in October 2007, just three months after signing with the club. He then immediately moved to Greece and signed with AEK Athens. He joined Trikala 2000 in 2008.  In the summer of 2009, he moved to PAOK BC. In February 2011 he signed with Energa Czarni Slupsk in Poland.

Retirement

Avery retired from professional basketball in 2012. After retirement, he returned to Evans, Georgia where he started a basketball camp. 

In the Fall of 2019, Avery returned to Duke University to complete his degree.

References

External links

1979 births
Living people
AEK B.C. players
Alba Berlin players
American expatriate basketball people in Germany
American expatriate basketball people in Greece
American expatriate basketball people in Israel
American expatriate basketball people in Poland
American expatriate basketball people in Turkey
American expatriate basketball people in Ukraine
American men's basketball players
Basketball players from Augusta, Georgia
BC Azovmash players
Duke Blue Devils men's basketball players
Galatasaray S.K. (men's basketball) players
Hapoel Tel Aviv B.C. players
Hapoel Jerusalem B.C. players
Israeli Basketball Premier League players
Makedonikos B.C. players
Minnesota Timberwolves draft picks
Minnesota Timberwolves players
Panionios B.C. players
P.A.O.K. BC players
Parade High School All-Americans (boys' basketball)
Point guards
SIG Basket players
Trikala B.C. players
Oak Hill Academy (Mouth of Wilson, Virginia) alumni